The Potez 26 was a single seat fighter aircraft designed and flown in France in the mid-1920s. It did not reach production.

Design and development

The Potez 26 was a lighter, smaller span, single-seat fighter version of the two-seat biplane Potez 25 reconnaissance aircraft. Both types were sesquiplanes with markedly smaller lower wings. Both upper and lower wings were rectangular in plan, with long-span ailerons only on the upper plane. They were single bay biplanes, their wing interconnected by N-form interplane struts assisted by wire bracing. These interplane struts leaned outwards and narrowed to meet the closer spars of the smaller-chord lower wing. Centrally, the upper wing was held over the upper fuselage by two pairs of struts, a parallel pair forward and an inverted V at the rear forming a cabane. There was a semicircular cut-out in the upper trailing edge to improve the pilot's forward view.

The Potez 26 was powered by either a  Hispano-Suiza 12J V-12, or the  Lorraine 12Ed W-12, both cooled by a radiator under the rear of the engine cowling. The mounting formed part of the forward fuselage structure, which had a plywood skinned central section containing the open cockpit, raised above the structural fuselage, with decking falling away ahead and behind and a wooden framed, fabric covered rear. At the rear, the tailplane was mounted on the upper fuselage structure and externally braced to it from below with pairs of inverted V struts. Its fin was small and round edged, carrying a broad, deep rudder which reached down to the keel.

The Potez 26 had a fixed tail wheel undercarriage with mainwheels on a split axle supported centrally by a V-strut, hinged on another pair of struts to the lower fuselage and with vertical, airfoil section shock absorbers. There was a sprung tailskid.

The Potez 26 made its first flight in August 1924 and was on display at the 1924 Paris Salon. Only one was built.

Specifications (Lorraine engine)

References

1920s French fighter aircraft
026
Sesquiplanes